Vladimir Georgiyevich Sorokin (born 7 August 1955) is a contemporary postmodern Russian writer and dramatist. He has been described as one of the most popular writers in modern Russian literature.

Biography

Sorokin was born on 7 August 1955 in Bykovo, Moscow Oblast, near Moscow. In 1972, he made his literary debut with a publication in the newspaper Za kadry neftyanikov (For the workers in the petroleum industry). He studied at the Gubkin Russian State University of Oil and Gas in Moscow and graduated in 1977 as an engineer.

After graduation, he worked for one year for the magazine Shift (Smena), before he had to leave due to his refusal to become a member of the Komsomol.

Throughout the 1970s, Sorokin participated in a number of art exhibitions and designed and illustrated nearly 50 books. Sorokin's development as a writer took place amidst painters and writers of the Moscow underground scene of the 1980s. In 1985, six of Sorokin's stories appeared in the Paris magazine A-Ya. In the same year, French publisher Syntaxe published his novel Ochered''' (The Queue).

Sorokin is a devout Christian, having been baptized at the age of 25.

Sorokin's works, examples of underground culture, were banned during the Soviet period. His first publication in the USSR appeared in November 1989, when the Riga-based Latvian magazine Rodnik (Spring) presented a group of Sorokin's stories. Soon after, his stories appeared in Russian literary miscellanies and magazines Tretya Modernizatsiya (The Third Modernization), Mitin Zhurnal (Mitya's Journal), Konets Veka (End of the Century), and Vestnik Novoy Literatury (Bulletin of the New Literature). In 1992, Russian publishing house Russlit published Sbornik Rasskazov (Collected Stories) – Sorokin's first book to be nominated for a Russian Booker Prize. Sorokin's early stories and novels are characterized by the combination of socialist-realist discourse with extreme physiological or absurd content; Sorokin himself has described his early writings as "little binary literary bombs made up of two incompatible parts: one socialist realist, and the other based on actual physiology, resulting in an explosion, and this gave me, the writer, a little spark of freedom." 

In September 2001, Vladimir Sorokin received the People's Booker Prize; two months later, he was presented with the Andrei Bely Prize for outstanding contributions to Russian literature. In 2002, there was a protest against his book , and he was investigated for pornography.

Sorokin's books have been translated into English, Portuguese, Spanish, French, German, Dutch, Finnish, Swedish, Norwegian, Danish, Italian, Polish, Japanese, Serbian, Korean, Romanian, Estonian, Slovak, Czech, Hungarian, Croatian and Slovenian, and are available through a number of prominent publishing houses, including Gallimard, Fischer, DuMont, BV Berlin, Haffman, Mlinarec & Plavic and Verlag der Autoren.

His 2006 novel, Day of the Oprichnik, describes a dystopian Russia in 2027, with a Tsar in the Kremlin, a Russian language with numerous Chinese expressions, and a "Great Russian Wall" separating the country from its neighbors. He was awarded in 2015 the Premio Gregor von Rezzori for this novel.

In 2016 he was accused by pro-Kremlin activists of "extremism", "pro-cannibalism themes" and "going against Russian Orthodox values" in his 2000 short story Nastya, the contents of which concern a 16-year-old being cooked alive in an oven and eaten by her family and friends.

In December 2019, Russian filmmaker Ilya Belov released the documentary "Sorokin Trip"  in which he portrayed and examined the writer's life and work.

2022 Russian invasion of Ukraine

On 24 February 2022 the Russian invasion of Ukraine was re-commenced. Three days later Sorokin published a piece highly critical of Vladimir Putin. In it he compared Putin to Ivan the Terrible and power in Russia to a medieval pyramid. He writes, "the idea of restoring the Russian Empire has entirely taken possession of Putin," and faults the destruction of the TV channel NTV for this opening. "Putin didn’t manage to outgrow the KGB officer inside of him, the officer who’d been taught that the USSR was the greatest hope for the progress of mankind and that the west was an enemy capable only of corruption."

For Sorokin, Putin's goal is not Ukraine. It is the dismemberment of NATO and the destruction of western civilization. 

In March 2022, Sorokin was among the signatories of an appeal by eminent writers to all Russian speakers to spread the truth about the war against Ukraine inside Russia.

Bibliography
Novels
 Норма (written 1979–1983, published by Tri Kita and Obscuri Viri, 1994). The Norm, trans. Max Lawton (New York Review Books, forthcoming)Очередь (written 1983, published by Syntaxe, 1985). The Queue, trans. Sally Laird (Readers International, 1988; New York Review Books, 2008)Тридцатая любовь Марины (written 1982–1984, published by Elinina, 1995). Marina’s 30th Love, trans. Max Lawton (Dalkey Archive, forthcoming)
 Роман (written 1985–1989, published by Tri Kita and Obscuri Viri, 1994). Roman, trans. Max Lawton (Dalkey Archive, forthcoming)
 Сердца Четырех (written 1991, published 1994). Their Four Hearts, trans. Max Lawton (Dalkey Archive, 2022)
 Голубое Сало (Ad Marginem, 1999). Blue Lard, trans. Max Lawton (New York Review Books, forthcoming)
 Лёд (Ad Marginem, 2002). Ice, trans. Jamey Gambrell (New York Review Books, 2007)
 Путь Бро (Zakharov Books, 2004). Bro, trans. Jamey Gambrell (in Ice Trilogy, 2011).
 23'000 (Zakharov Books, 2005). 23,000, trans. Jamey Gambrell (in Ice Trilogy, 2011).
 День опричника (Zakharov Books, 2006). Day of the Oprichnik, trans. Jamey Gambrell (2010)
 Сахарный кремль. (AST, 2008). The Sugar Kremlin Метель (AST, 2010). The Blizzard, trans. Jamey Gambrell (Farrar, Straus and Giroux, 2015)
 Теллурия (AST, 2013). Telluria, trans. Max Lawton (New York Review Books, 2022)
 Манарага (Corpus, 2017). Manaraga Доктор Гарин (Corpus, 2021). Doctor Garin Compilations and short stories Первый субботник (written 1979–1984, published by Ad Marginem, 1998). The First Saturday WorkdayМесяц в дахау (1990, published by Ad Marginem, 1998). A Month in DachauПир (Ad Marginem, 2000). FeastЗаплыв (AST, 2008). SwimСахарный кремль (AST, 2008). Sugar KremlinМоноклон (АST, 2010). MonocloniusIce Trilogy (New York Review Books, 2011). Bro, Ice, and 23,000 published together in one volume.Белый квадрат (Corpus, 2018). The white squarePlays
 Пельмени (1984–1987). Pelmeni Землянка (1985). The Dugout Русская бабушка (1988). Russian Grandmother Доверие (1989). Confidence Дисморфомания (1990). Dysmorphomania Юбилей (1993). Anniversary Hochzeitsreise (1994–1995). The Post-Nuptial Journey Щи (1995–1996). Shchi Dostoevsky-Trip (1997).
 С Новым Годом (1998). Happy New Year Капитал (2006). Capital Занос (2009). The Snow DriftFilm scripts
 Безумный Фриц ("Mad Fritz") (1994). Directors: Tatiana Didenko and Alexander Shamaysky.
 Москва ("Moscow") (2000). Director: Alexander Zeldovich. First Prize in the festival in Bonn; Award of Federation of Russian Film-Clubs for best Russian movie of the year.
 Копейка ("Kopeck") (2002). Director: Ivan Dykhovichny. Nomination for Zolotoy Oven Award for best film script.
 Вещ ("Thing") (2002). Director: Ivan Dykhovichny.
 4 ("Four") (2005). Director: Ilya Khrzhanovsky. Grand Jury Prize of International Film Festival Rotterdam.
 Мишень ("Target") (2011). Director: Alexander Zeldovich.

Other works
 Photograph album В глубь России ("Into the Depths of Russia"), in cooperation with painter Oleg Kulik.
 Libretto for opera Дети Розенталя ("The Children of Rosenthal"), with music by Leonid Desyatnikov; written on request of the Bolshoi Theatre, Moscow.
 Нормальная история ("A Normal Story") (2019), a collection of Sorokin's essays written in the 2010s.
 Dozens of stories published in Russian and foreign periodicals.

References

External links
 
 Official Webpage.
 Full bibliography 
 
 .
 "Russia Is Slipping Back into an Authoritarian Empire", interview to Der Spiegel, 2 February 2007.
 "The Wait: On Vladimir Sorokin", The Nation, Elaine Blair, 25 March 2009
 "Ice by Vladimir Sorokin", Bookslut, February 2007
 
 "Ice Trilogy by Vladimir Sorokin", nthWORD Magazine Shorts'', Ryan O'Connor, July 2011

1955 births
Living people
20th-century Russian dramatists and playwrights
20th-century Russian male writers
21st-century Russian dramatists and playwrights
21st-century Russian male writers
People from Ramensky District
Eastern Orthodox Christians from Russia
Eastern Orthodox writers
Postmodern writers
Russian dramatists and playwrights
Russian male writers
Counterculture of the 1990s
Writers about Russia
Russian activists against the 2022 Russian invasion of Ukraine